Waleed Saleh (Arabic:وليد صالح) (born 7 February 1992) is a Qatari footballer. He currently plays for Muaither .

External links

References

Qatari footballers
1992 births
Living people
Al-Wakrah SC players
Muaither SC players
Place of birth missing (living people)
Qatar Stars League players
Qatari Second Division players
Association football midfielders